Pietrabruna ( or ) is a comune (municipality) in the Province of Imperia in the Italian region Liguria, located about  southwest of Genoa and about  west of Imperia.

Pietrabruna borders the following municipalities: Castellaro, Cipressa, Civezza, Dolcedo, Pompeiana, and Taggia.

Demographic evolution

References

Cities and towns in Liguria